This article lists the winners and nominees for the Black Reel Award for Outstanding Screenplay of a Television Movie or Limited Series. As of the 2016 ceremony, Reggie Rock Bythewood is the only writer to win the award twice and David Simon is the only other person to have achieved a second nomination. In May 2017 the category was moved from the film awards as part of the Black Reel Awards for Television honors thus resulting in two separate winners in 2017.

Winners and nominees
Winners are listed first and highlighted in bold.

2000s

2010s

2020s

Total awards by network

 HBO - 7
 BET - 2
 FX - 2
 Netflix - 2
 ABC - 1
 Amazon Studios - 1
 CBS - 1
 Lifetime - 1
 Showtime - 1

Individuals with multiple awards

2 awards
 Reggie Rock Bythewood

Individuals with multiple nominations

 4 Nominations 
 Ava DuVernay

 3 Nominations 
  Rhonda Baraka
 Reggie Rock Bythewood
 John Ridley

2 Nominations 
 Julian Breece
 Michaela Coel
 Joe Robert Cole 
 Damon Lindelof
 Attica Locke 
 Dee Rees
 David Simon 
 Abdul Williams

Programs with multiple awards

Programs with multiple nominations

6 nominations
 American Crime

4 nominations
 When They See Us

2 nominations
 American Crime Story
 I May Destroy You
 Watchmen
 The Murders of Tupac and the Notorious B.I.G.

References

Black Reel Awards